Akyaawa Yikwan was a royalty from the Asante Kingdom who served as chief negotiator of the 1831 Anglo-Asante peace treaty.

Background 
Akyaawa Yikwan was the daughter of king Osei Kwadwo of the Ashanti Kingdom in West Africa. Her mother was a customary wife to the king Osei Kwadwo.

The Ashanti collected taxes from castles and forts along the coastal belt of Ghana around the middle of the seventeenth century. After the loss of the battle of Akatamanso between the southern states and the kingdom of Ashanti that saw the liberation of the Ga-Adangme and the rest of the southern states from  the Ashanti, and the renunciation of Ashanti lordship over their lands, Akyaawa Yikwan who was described as "a woman of masculine spirit" was arrested and traded to the Danes. Two of her brothers were killed in the war and her son in-law Oti Payin was beheaded.

Peace treaty 
The Council of Merchants in Accra that included the British felt that they could use the position of Akyaawa Yikwan to open up communication and trade opportunities with Kumasi, the capital of the Ashanti Kingdom. Akyaawa Yikwan was bought by the British and released in 1831 as an emissary to the kingdom of Ashanti in an attempt to open up trade routes between the two parties.

References

Ghanaian royalty
Year of birth missing
Year of death missing
19th-century people